Honor Thyself is a novel written by Danielle Steel and published by Delacorte Press in February 2008. The book is Steel's 74th best-selling novel. It is a courageous journey of survival, memory, and self-discovery.

Plot summary

World-famous actress Carole Barber has come to Paris to work on her new novel and to find herself. But on a cool November evening, her taxi speeds into a tunnel just past the Louvre, and into the fiery grasp of a terrible terrorist explosion causing her to be left unconscious and unidentified in a Paris emergency room for weeks.

Carole’s friends and family begin to make inquiries into her disappearance only to find that Carole is far from home and fighting for her life. Carole' family and friends swarm to the hospital and pray for her recovery to find she has amnesia and doesn't remember her own family.

Gradually, Carole slowly regains her memory, new friends and love along the way to begin to truly honor herself in this tale of survival and hope.

Footnotes
http://www.randomhouse.com/features/steel/bookshelf/display.pperl?isbn=9780385340243

2008 American novels
American romance novels
Novels by Danielle Steel
Novels set in Paris
Delacorte Press books